Willard Holland (December 18, 1907 – May 19, 1984) was an American race car driver from Philadelphia, Pennsylvania, who won the Indianapolis 500 in 1949 and finished second in 1947, 1948 and 1950. He also was runner up in the 1947 American Automobile Association (AAA) National Championship.

Background
Holland was born on December 18, 1907, the son of major league baseball player Willard Holland. He was excellent at skating and tried out for the 1932 Olympics.

Racing career
Holland was getting better results in big car (now sprint car) in 1937. He recorded his first win on July 30, 1938, at Mineola, New York. He won three times in 1939 and nine times in 1940. Holland finished second to Joie Chitwood in the 1940 AAA Eastern championship and he won the championship in 1941. No racing happened in the United States between 1942 and 1945 due to World War II.

In 1946, Holland won 15 Eastern and 1 Midwestern "big car" (now sprint car) races to finish fourth in the AAA national championship.  On July 20, 1946, Holland won the first race at Selinsgrove Speedway in an American Automobile Association-sanctioned event. He nearly won the 1947 Indianapolis 500 as a rookie, but slowed and allowed teammate Mauri Rose to pass him seven laps from the end, mistakenly believing that Rose was a lap down. In 1949 Holland led late in the race when Rose (still teammate to Holland on Lou Moore's Blue Crown Spark Plug team) began to slowly close on Holland. Moore saw what was happening out on the track and hung out a pit board ordering both drivers to hold their respective positions to the finish. Rose picked up the pace, closing on Holland. But with 8 laps to go, Rose suffered a magneto failure and Holland cruised to the victory. When Rose returned to the pits, Moore fired Rose on the spot.

On November 14, 1951, Holland was suspended from AAA Indy Car racing for one year after competing in a three-lap Lion's Charity race at Opa-locka, Florida which was a NASCAR event. The American Automobile Association, at the time the sanctioning body for Indycar races, had a strict rule forbidding its drivers from participating in any races other than their own and would blacklist violators. He returned to Indycar racing in 1953.

Holland raced until 1965. He is believed to have got over 40 sprint car feature wins and 150 podiums.

Life after racing and death
Holland and his wife Myra ran skating rinks in Bridgeport, Connecticut. They lived briefly in Colorado Springs, Colorado before moving to Tucson, Arizona in the early 1970s.

Holland was diagnosed with Alzheimer's disease in November 1983 and died from complications of the disease on May 19, 1984. He had remained active throughout his life and would regularly ride a bicycle for 50 miles per day until a year before his death.

Legacy
He was inducted in the National Sprint Car Hall of Fame in 2005. When Selinsgrove Speedway held its first United States Auto Club (USAC) Silver Crown race in 2020, it was named the Bill Holland Classic. The race was 74 laps long as it was the 74th year after Holland's win to open the track.

Complete AAA Championship Car results

Indianapolis 500 results

Although Holland started the 1947 race from the middle of the third row, he posted the fastest qualifying time.

World Championship career summary
The Indianapolis 500 was part of the FIA World Championship from 1950 through 1960. Drivers competing at Indy during those years were credited with World Championship points and participation. Bill Holland participated in 2 World Championship races, finishing on the podium once and scoring 6 World Championship points.

Complete Formula One World Championship results
(key)

References

1907 births
1984 deaths
Indianapolis 500 drivers
Indianapolis 500 winners
National Sprint Car Hall of Fame inductees
AAA Championship Car drivers
Racing drivers from Philadelphia